Operation Stab was a British-led naval deception during World War II in order to try to distract Japanese units for the upcoming Guadalcanal campaign by US forces.

The operation 
Having received a request from Admiral King to provide a distraction for Operation Watchtower, Vice Admiral Sir James Somerville decided on a fake invasion force, which were to sortie towards the Andaman Islands in an effort to draw Japanese forces to the area. Somerville himself would be shadowing with 'Force A' consisting of the battleship HMS Warspite, aircraft carriers HMS Illustrious and HMS Formidable, light cruisers HMS Birmingham, HMS Effingham, HMS Mauritius and HNLMS Jacob van Heemskerck and destroyers , HMAS Napier, HMAS Nizam, HMAS Norman and HNLMS Van Galen.

Units started to assemble along the Indian coast and at Ceylon from 21-25 July, with a start date of 1 August. 'Force A' sortied early on the 30th after reports of Japanese cruisers being seen. The three dummy fleets set sail on 1 August from Vizagapatam ('Force V'), Madras ('Force M') and Trincomalee ('Force T'), this last force contained the RFA tankers Appleleaf and Broomdale.

On the evening of the 1st 'Operation Spark' was carried out, this was a faked plain language SOS message from one of the ships reporting a collision and unable to move. The diversion forces then turned to return to port. Somerville stayed nearby for some hours but as no Japanese attacks or movements developed, and his heavy ships were required for Operation Stream Line Jane he decided to end the operation and return to port.

Aftermath 
While the operation was carried out successfully and without combat losses, the Japanese failed to take the bait and no significant naval or air units were redeployed – although the seaplane tender Sagara Maru was sent to the islands on the 4th and a bomber unit sent to reinforce Sabang so it could be said to have been a minor success.

Several Japanese planes were spotted, and one Mavis was shot down by a Martlet from Formidable, for the loss of two Martlets and two Fulmars due to accidents and engine failure.

References 

Battles of World War II involving Japan
Guadalcanal Campaign
Campaigns, operations and battles of World War II involving the United Kingdom
Battles of World War II involving Australia